= Polar jet =

Polar jet may refer to:

- one of the principal jet streams in the earth's atmosphere
- an astrophysical jet ejected along the axis of rotation of certain stars
